is a 1966 Japanese drama film directed by Mikio Naruse. It is based on the 1951 novel The Thin Line by Edward Atiyah.

Plot
Isao and Masako Toshiro are what looks like a happily married middle-class couple with two children. One day, Sayuri, wife of close friend Ryukichi Sugimoto, is found strangled. As it turns out, Sayuri had an affair with another man. Isao, struggling with his conscience, confesses to Masako that he was the man Sayuri had the affair with, and was responsible for her death, although inadvertently. To preserve the family's reputation and sheltered life, Masako begs her husband to keep his deed a secret. Isao also confesses to Ryukichi, who slaps him in return, but refrains from bringing charges against him. When Isao eventually announces to turn himself in to the police, which he sees as the only way to find peace and maintain his personal honour, Masako poisons him with a soporific. His death is classified as suicide. Some time later, while taking a walk on the beach with her children, Masako wonders how she will be able to live with her secret.

Cast
 Keiju Kobayashi as Isao Tashiro
 Michiyo Aratama as Masako Tashiro
 Mitsuko Kusabue as Yumiko Kato
 Tatsuya Mihashi as Ryukichi Sugimoto
 Akiko Wakabayashi as Sayuri Sugimoto
 Daisuke Katō as Bar owner
 Toshio Kurosawa as Bartender
 Chieko Nakakita as Chiyoko

Release and legacy
The Stranger Within a Woman was produced and distributed by Toho and received a roadshow theatrical release on January 25, 1966. The film was released with English subtitles in the United States by Toho International in July 1967.

Edward Atiyah's novel was again adapted for the screen by Claude Chabrol for Just Before Nightfall (1971). The Stranger Within a Woman was also remade twice for Japanese television in 1981 (again scripted by Toshirō Ide) and 2017.

Awards
Mainichi Film Concour for Best Supporting Actor Tatsuya Mihashi

References

External links

1966 films
1966 drama films
Japanese drama films
Japanese black-and-white films
Films directed by Mikio Naruse
Toho films
Films based on British novels
1960s Japanese films